RAF Caistor is a former Royal Air Force Relief Landing Ground located  south east of Brigg, Lincolnshire and  north west of Binbrook, Lincolnshire, England, the site is now used for farming.

History

Second World War
 Satellite of No. 1 Air Armament School RAF (December 1942 - June 1943)
 Relief Landing Ground for No. 15 (Pilots) Advanced Flying Unit RAF (June - September 1942)
 No. 53 Operational Training Unit RAF (1943-44)
 A detachment of No. 85 Squadron RAF
 Sub site for No. 93 Maintenance Unit RAF (December 1948 - December 1950)
 Sub site for No. 233 Maintenance Unit RAF (February 1945 - ?)
 Relief Landing Ground for RAF College SFTS (June 1943 - March 1944) became Relief Landing Ground for No. 17 Service Flying Training School RAF (March 1944 - February 1945)

Cold War
 No. 269 Squadron RAF with PGM-17 Thors

Current use
The site has now returned to agricultural use, and little remains of the military facilities.

References

Citations

Bibliography

External links
 
 

Royal Air Force stations in Lincolnshire
RAF